The 1907 Springfield Training School football team was an American football team that represented the International Young Men's Christian Association Training School—now known as Springfield College–as an independent during the 1907 college football season. Led by James H. McCurdy, who returned for his tenth season as head coach after helming the team from 1895 to 1903, Springfield compiled a record of 2–4–2.

Schedule

References

Springfield Training School
Springfield Pride football seasons
Springfield Training School football